John Rush (5 April 1910 – 13 January 1982) was an Australian cricketer. He played two first-class cricket matches for Victoria in 1931.

See also
 List of Victoria first-class cricketers

References

External links
 

1910 births
1982 deaths
Australian cricketers
Victoria cricketers
Cricketers from Melbourne